Inani Beach, part of Cox's Bazar Beach, is an  sea beach in Ukhia Upazila of Cox's Bazar District, Bangladesh. It has a lot of coral stones, which are very sharp. These coral stones look black and green, and they are found in summer or rainy seasons.

References

Beaches of Cox's Bazar
Cox's Bazar District
Bay of Bengal